The Mandasor Pillar Inscriptions of Yashodharman are a set of Sanskrit inscriptions from early 6th-century discovered at an archaeological site at the village of Sondani (सोंधनी), about 4 kilometers south of Mandsaur (Mandasor) in northwestern Madhya Pradesh, India. These record the victory of Aulikara king Yasodharman over the Swastik Mihirakula. According to Richard Salomon, these are notable for "their outstanding literary, calligraphic and historical value". The Mandasor inscription praises Yasodharman, describes him as having rescued the earth from "rude and cruel kings of the Kali age, who delight in viciousness". 

Fleet first published his translation of the inscription in 1888. The Fleet's translation of the inscription has been corrected by various scholars.

Location
The inscriptions were found on a pair of pillars, at a site southeast of Mandsaur, Madhya Pradesh in what was then a small village called Sondani. The town is also referred to as Mandasor, Dasor or Dasapura in historic texts. The site contained not only the pillars but ruins of a Hindu temple and many desecrated panels and statues. They were discovered by John Fleet in 1884, and first published in 1886. It is currently at its original site, which is now housed within compounds of the Mandsaur's Yashodharman Archaeology Museum. The site was excavated by a team led by Garde in 1923, who found some of Fleet's presumptions incorrect. He also found double human figures buried in soil below. It was of the type similar to other Gupta era site, that likely stood above the pair of pillars, before it was toppled at some point, at the site.

Description
The major inscriptions exist on a pair of light red sandstone pillars. The base of the first column is rectangular. Above it is a square section, then a sixteen faced column shaft that rises vertically. The inscription is somewhat difficult to locate because of the hue of the stone and the antiquity of the inscription. Near the primary pillar with inscription, Fleet found a number of ruins of panels and statues which were not a part of the pillar or inscription, but of a larger monument that went with it. Fleet noted that at the time of his 1884 visit there are "row of chisel marks all round the column here" and it was "deliberately broken by the insertion of wedges".

The inscription has survived in a form that can be traced with ink-impression technologies. These are in Sanskrit, Gupta script of later northern variety such as in the way the upagudha are inscribed. The text is in poetic verse form, and at the end is inscribed the name of scribe in prose.

The inscription states that Yasodharman's dominions covered the regions between Brahmaputra River (Assam) to the western ocean (Arabian Sea, Sindh) from the Himalayas (Kashmir) to the Mahendra mountains (either Odisha, or someplace in Western Ghats). It states that Mihirakula was defeated and did homage to Yasodharman. The inscriptions are not dated.

Inscription Pillar 1
SIDDHAM has published the critically edited version of the inscription as:

Fleet's translation of Pillar 1 Inscription
The inscription was translated by John Faithfull Fleet in Corpus Inscriptionum Indicarum: Inscriptions of the Early Guptas in 1888:

Corrections to Fleet's translation

Scholars have published a series of papers that question Fleet's translation and some have proposed significant revisions. For example, Lorenz Franz Kielhorn published the following corrections, which Fleet concurred is a better translation:
Line 3: He, in whom, possessed of a wealth of virtue, (and so) failing but little short of Manu and Bharata and Alarka and Mandhatri, the title of 'universal sovereign' - which in this age that is the ravisher of good behavior, applied with a mere imaginary meaning to other kings, of reprehensible conduct, has not shone at all, (being in their case) like an offering of flowers (placed) in the dust, - shines even more (that it ordinarily does), like a resplendent jewel (set) in good gold.
Line 6: He (Yasodharman) to whose two feet respect was paid, with complementary presents of the flowers from the lock of hair on the top of (his) head, by even that (famous) king Mihirakula, whose head had never (previously) been brought into the humility of obeisance to any other save (the god) Sthanu, (and) embraced by whose arms the mountain of snow falsely prides itself on being styled an inaccessible fortress, (and) whose forehead was pained through being (now for the first time) bent low down by the strength of (his) arm in (the act of compelling) obeisance.

Other inscriptions

Several additional inscriptions were discovered at the same Mandasor site by Fleet and other scholars between 1884 and 1923. One of these is a duplicate, but with many lines lost because of damage at some point later.

Significance
According to Sagar, the Huna king Toramana was cruel and barbaric, Mihirakula even more so, during their rule. Mihirakula had conquered Sindh by 520 CE, had a large elephant and cavalry-driven army. Mihirkula destroyed Buddhist sites, ruined monasteries, according to Sagar. Yashodharman, about 532 CE, reversed Mihirakula's campaign and started the end of Mihirakula era. Other scholars state that there are many legends surrounding this era and historical facts are difficult to ascertain. The Chinese pilgrim Xuanzang (Hsuan Tsang) mentions Mihirakula as conquering Kashmir first, then Gandhara, then attempting to conquer central and eastern India, but getting vanquished by Yashodharman and Narasimhagupta Baladitya. Mihirakula was captured during the war, but his life spared because Baladitya's mother intervened and argued against capital punishment.

References

Gupta and post-Gupta inscriptions
Sanskrit inscriptions in India
6th-century inscriptions